Oak Hill is a summit located in Central New York Region of New York located in the Town of Herkimer in Herkimer County, northwest of Herkimer.

References

Mountains of Herkimer County, New York
Mountains of New York (state)